Where Are You? is an album by jazz pianist Mal Waldron recorded in 1989 and released on the Italian Soul Note label.

Reception
The Allmusic review by Ron Wynn awarded the album 3 stars, stating: "Mal Waldron's mellow and sentimental side is tapped on this session... A less demonstrative, but still quite enjoyable, Mal Waldron date."

Track listing
All compositions by Mal Waldron except as indicated
 "Where Are You?" [take 1] (Harold Adamson, Jimmy McHugh) — 5:12 
 "Waltz for Marianne" — 21:56 
 "Wha's Nine?" (Reggie Workman) — 22:10 
 "Where Are You?" [take 2] (Adamson, McHugh) — 9:38 
Recorded in New York City on June 10, 1989

Personnel
Mal Waldron — piano
Sonny Fortune — alto saxophone
Ricky Ford — tenor saxophone
Reggie Workman — bass
Eddie Moore — drums

References

1988 albums
Mal Waldron albums
Black Saint/Soul Note albums